Vincent Joseph Gallagher Jr. (April 30, 1899 – June 27, 1983) was an American rower, born in Brooklyn, who competed in the 1920 Summer Olympics.

In 1920, he was part of the American boat from the United States Naval Academy (USNA), which won the gold medal in the men's eight. He graduated from USNA in 1922.

References

External links
 
 
 

1899 births
1983 deaths
Sportspeople from Brooklyn
Rowers at the 1920 Summer Olympics
Olympic gold medalists for the United States in rowing
United States Naval Academy alumni
American male rowers
Medalists at the 1920 Summer Olympics